Protodriloides is a genus of polychaetes belonging to the monotypic family Protodriloididae.

The species of this genus are found in Europe and Northern America.

Species:

Protodriloides chaetifer 
Protodriloides symbioticus

References

Polychaetes
Annelid genera